ÖBB Class 5047 is a diesel railcar used by the Austrian Federal Railways (ÖBB) for local passenger rail service.

History
In 1983, ÖBB ordered six newly developed railcars modelled on the DB Class 627 from Jenbacher Werke. Presented to the press in July 1987 at Rosenburg, the first railcars ran in the Lower Austrian Waldviertel region. A total of 100 units were built until 1995, ten additional two-unit railcars were numbered ÖBB Class 5147.

References

External links 
 

Austrian Federal Railways diesel multiple units
Train-related introductions in 1987